Capital Adequacy Ratio (CAR) is also known as Capital to Risk (Weighted) Assets Ratio (CRAR), is the ratio of a bank's capital to its risk.  National regulators track a bank's CAR to ensure that it can absorb a reasonable amount of loss and complies with statutory Capital requirements.

It is a measure of a bank's capital. It is expressed as a percentage of a bank's risk-weighted credit exposures. The enforcement of regulated levels of this ratio is intended to protect depositors and promote stability and efficiency of financial systems around the world.

Two types of capital are measured: tier one capital, which can absorb losses without a bank being required to cease trading, and tier two capital, which can absorb losses in the event of a winding-up and so provides a lesser degree of protection to depositors.

Formula
Capital adequacy ratios (CARs) are a measure of the amount of a bank's core capital expressed as a percentage of its risk-weighted asset.

Capital adequacy ratio is defined as:

TIER 1 CAPITAL = (paid up capital + statutory reserves + disclosed free reserves) - (equity investments in subsidiary + intangible assets + current & brought-forward losses)

TIER 2 CAPITAL = A) Undisclosed Reserves + B) General Loss reserves + C) hybrid debt capital instruments and subordinated debts

where Risk can either be weighted assets or the respective national regulator's minimum total capital requirement.  If using risk weighted assets,

 ≥ 10%.

The percent threshold varies from bank to bank (10% in this case, a common requirement for regulators conforming to the Basel Accords) and is set by the national banking regulator of different countries.

Two types of capital are measured: tier one capital ( above), which can absorb losses without a bank being required to cease trading, and tier two capital ( above), which can absorb losses in the event of a winding-up and so provides a lesser degree of protection to depositors.

Use
Capital adequacy ratio is the ratio which determines the bank's capacity to meet the time liabilities and other risks such as credit risk, operational risk etc. In the most simple formulation, a bank's capital is the "cushion" for potential losses, and protects the bank's depositors and other lenders. Banking regulators in most countries define and monitor CAR to protect depositors, thereby maintaining confidence in the banking system.

CAR is similar to leverage; in the most basic formulation, it is comparable to the inverse of debt-to-equity leverage formulations (although CAR uses equity over assets instead of debt-to-equity; since assets are by definition equal to debt plus equity, a transformation is required). Unlike traditional leverage, however, CAR recognizes that assets can have different levels of risk.

Risk weighting
Since different types of assets have different risk profiles, CAR primarily adjusts for assets that are less risky by allowing banks to "discount" lower-risk assets. The specifics of CAR calculation vary from country to country, but general approaches tend to be similar for countries that apply the Basel Accords. In the most basic application, government debt is allowed a 0% "risk weighting" - that is, they are subtracted from total assets for purposes of calculating the CAR.

Risk weighting example
Risk weighted assets - Fund Based : Risk weighted assets mean fund based assets such as cash, loans, investments and other assets. Degrees of credit risk expressed as percentage weights have been assigned by the national regulator to each such assets.

Non-funded (Off-Balance sheet) Items : The credit risk exposure attached to off-balance sheet items has to be first calculated by multiplying the face amount of each of the off-balance sheet items by the Credit Conversion Factor. This will then have to be again multiplied by the relevant weightage.

Local regulations establish that cash and government bonds have a 0% risk weighting, and residential mortgage loans have a 50% risk weighting. All other types of assets (loans to customers) have a 100% risk weighting.

Bank "A" has assets totaling 100 units, consisting of:
 Cash: 10 units
 Government bonds: 15 units
 Mortgage loans: 20 units
 Other loans: 50 units
 Other assets: 5 units

Bank "A" has debt of 95 units, all of which are deposits. By definition, equity is equal to assets minus debt, or 5 units.

Bank A's risk-weighted assets are calculated as follows

Even though Bank A would appear to have a debt-to-equity ratio of 95:5, or equity-to-assets of only 5%, its CAR is substantially higher. It is considered less risky because some of its assets are less risky than others.

Types of capital
The Basel rules recognize that different types of equity are more important than others. To recognize this, different adjustments are made:
 Tier I Capital: Actual contributed equity plus retained earnings...
 Tier II Capital: Preferred shares plus 50% of subordinated debt...

Different minimum CARs are applied. For example, the minimum Tier I equity allowed by statute for  risk-weighted assets may be 6%, while the minimum CAR when including Tier II capital may be 8%.

There is usually a maximum of Tier II capital that may be "counted" towards CAR, which varies by jurisdiction.

See also
 Capital requirement
 Tier 1 capital
 Tier 2 capital
 Basel accords

References

External links
 Capital Adequacy Ratio at Investopedia.

Financial economics
Financial ratios
Capital requirement